The Arab Film Festival (AFF) is the flagship program of the Arab Film and Media Institute (AFMI) a nonprofit organization that hosts the largest and longest-running independent Arab film festival in the United States. It is held in California each year in San Francisco, Los Angeles, San Jose, San Diego, and Berkeley.

Overview 
The Arab Film and Media Institute was founded in the San Francisco Bay Area in 1996 as the Arab Film Festival. It aimed to counter common stereotypes of Arabs shown in the media and provide opportunities for a new generation of Arab filmmakers to showcase their work.  In addition to its annual Arab Film Festival, it also hosts individual screenings throughout the year.

Leadership 
Several prominent Arab-Americans have been involved with the Festival throughout the years, among them actor Tony Shalhoub and media critic Jack Shaheen. Both serve on its advisory board. The Festival is run by Executive Director Serge Bakalian and a Board of Directors, including Feras Mousilli, Danielle Siragusa, and Hisham Zawil.

Award winners 
 2012 Arab Film Festival Awards
 Outstanding Feature Film: Death for Sale by Faouzi Bensaidi, Morocco
 Outstanding Documentary Film: The Virgin, The Copts and Me by Namir Abdel Messeeh, France, Qatar
 Outstanding Short Documentary: Karama Has No Walls by Sara Ishaq, Yemen
 Outstanding Short Narrative Winner: Farewell Exile by Lamia Alami, Morocco
 Honorable Mention: Yamo by Rami Nihawi, Lebanon

References

External links 
 Official website

Film festivals in the San Francisco Bay Area
Film festivals established in 1996